Pertti Ilmari Niittylä (born January 16, 1956) is a former ice speed skater from Finland, who was the nation's leading rider in the 1970s and 1980s. He represented his native country in four consecutive Winter Olympics, starting in 1976 in Innsbruck, Austria.

References

External links
 SkateResults

1956 births
Living people
Finnish male speed skaters
Speed skaters at the 1976 Winter Olympics
Speed skaters at the 1980 Winter Olympics
Speed skaters at the 1984 Winter Olympics
Speed skaters at the 1988 Winter Olympics
Olympic speed skaters of Finland